Ikornnes is a village in Sykkylven Municipality in Møre og Romsdal county, Norway.

The village is home to the largest furniture manufacturer in Norway, Ekornes.  Ikornnes Church is located in this village.

References

Villages in Møre og Romsdal
Sykkylven